Roots of Health (Ugat ng Kalusugan) is a nonprofit organization focused on improving the reproductive, maternal and sexual health of women, girls, and their communities in Puerto Princesa, Palawan in the Philippines. The organization aims to encourage self-reliance and independence among women, young people and families in Palawan by providing scientifically accurate information on health, along with age-appropriate educational services to change health attitudes and behaviors. Roots of Health also seeks to reduce the incidence of maternal mortality, HIV and promote the importance of preventing teenage pregnancy to help ensure continued education.

History
Roots of Health was founded in 2009 by Susan Evangelista and her daughter Amina Evangelista Swanepoel. Evangelista, a professor at Palawan State University, was initially concerned about the unplanned pregnancies and lack of reproductive health knowledge among her students. Recognizing this unmet need, the two women worked together to establish an organization focusing on reproductive and women's health, with the larger goal of improving health and quality of life in this impoverished province of the Philippines.

Work
Women-Oriented Programs

Roots of Health employs a rigorous needs assessment process that involves interviews and surveys in order to select underserved communities in Puerto Princesa that would most benefit from their work. Once the communities are selected, they offer a comprehensive package of programs and services to any and all women and young people in the community who wish to partake, including the following:
Contraceptive Acceptors Program
Healthy Pregnancy Program (i.e., free pregnancy testing, provision of prenatal vitamins, medical check-ups)
Community Health Advocate Program
Medical Missions

The organization currently has ten active communities in Puerto Princesa City. The missions are conducted to reach poor women in isolated areas of Palawan. Roots of Health have provided services as far as Balabac in the South and Coron in the North.

Youth-Oriented Programs
Youth Advocate Program 
Reproductive health, puberty and HIV seminars for high school and college students 
Health fairs for college and high schools
Usapang K (Talk K) radio show and website

Children-Oriented Programs
Community educational support program (i.e., recreational activities for children whose mothers are participating in the maternal health/financial literacy classes)

Media recognition
Roots of Health was recently recognized by the Bill and Melinda Gates Foundation's Family Health Division as a headline non-profit for funding on Catapult.org. Their staff and programming have been consistently featured in notable global and national news outlets, including The Guardian.

Swanepoel, the Executive Director, has also been featured in several publications including Celebrity Living, Women’s Health and Cosmopolitan Magazine. She was named a finalist for the Millennium Development Goal of Improving Maternal Health. and previously nominated for an MDG Warrior award by Probe Media Foundation in the Philippines.

US Board members
Dr. Marty Dewees 
Justine Fonte
Dr. Sabrina Hermosilla
Suneeta Kaimal
Kathleen Mallari
Keefe Murren
Rachel Ocampo
David Callan

PH Board members
Susan Evangelista
Michelle Ongpin
Pamela Cajilig
Mae Legazpi
Dr. Junice Melgar
Sara Reysio-Cruz

External link
Roots of Health Website - "Homecoming Heroes" Smile Magazine. Kat Jack, August 2010.

References

Non-profit organizations based in the Philippines
Organizations established in 2009
Puerto Princesa